Valenciano is a Spanish surname. It is a regional name denoting someone from Valencia. Notable people with the surname include:

 Dragos Dolanescu Valenciano (born 1975), Costa Rican politician
 Elena Valenciano (born 1960), Spanish politician
 Emilie Valenciano (born 1997), Costa Rican footballer
 Gab Valenciano (born 1988), Filipino actor and singer
 Gary Valenciano (born 1964), Filipino actor, singer-songwriter, and television host
 Iván Valenciano (born 1972), Colombian footballer
 Kiana Valenciano (born 1992), Filipino R&B singer and songwriter

Spanish-language surnames
Spanish toponymic surnames